Northway Bank, is a community bank located in New Hampshire. It was established in 1997 when the Berlin City Bank and the Pemigewasset National Bank merged, creating Northway Financial and adopting the name Northway Bank in 2005. Today, it is New Hampshire's largest independent commercial bank and the top-ranking SBA lender in the state.

Locations
Northway Bank has a total of 18 branches throughout the state, primarily in the northern portion of the state. Northway's main office is located in Berlin.
 
 Berlin - 9 Main Street, Berlin, NH 03570
 Campton - 414 Route 49, Campton, NH 03223
 Concord - 66 N Main Street, Concord, NH 03301 
 Conway Village - 34 W. Main Street, Conway, NH 03818
 Gorham - 260 Main Street, Gorham, NH 03581
 Intervale - 3424 White Mountain Highway, North Conway, NH 03860
 Laconia - 400 S. Main Street, Laconia, NH 03246
 Manchester - 29 Cilley Road, Manchester, NH 03103 
 Meredith - 42 Upper Ladd Hill Road, Meredith, NH 03253 
 Settler's Crossing - 1500 White Mountain Highway, North Conway, NH 03860
 Pittsfield - 55 Main Street, Pittsfield, NH 03263
 Plymouth - 1-3 Highland Street, Plymouth, NH 03264
 Portsmouth - 750 Lafayette Road, Portsmouth, NH 03801
 Tilton - 5 Market Street, Tilton, NH 03276
 West Ossipee - Routes 16 & 25, West Ossipee, NH 03890
 West Plymouth - 287 Highland Street, West Plymouth, NH 03264

Closed locations
 Ashland - 130 Main Street, Ashland, NH 03217
 Belmont - 9 Old State Road, Belmont, NH 03220
 Franklin - 354 Central Street, Franklin, NH 03235
 Groveton - 3 State Street, Groveton, NH 03582 (sold to Union Bank of Vermont)
 Littleton - 76 Main Street, Littleton, NH 03561 (sold to Union Bank of Vermont)
 North Woodstock - 155 Main Street, North Woodstock, NH 03262 (sold to Union Bank of Vermont)
 North Conway Location - 3278 White Mountain Highway, North Conway, NH 03860 (relocated)

References

Banks based in New Hampshire
Financial services in the United States
Mortgage lenders of the United States